WXLN-LP (93.3 FM) is a radio station licensed to Shelbyville, Kentucky, United States.  The station is currently owned by Bullock's Christian Broadcasting Corporation.

References

External links
 
 WXLN Radio

XLN-LP
XLN-LP